DAA or Daa may refer to:

People
Ludvig Kristensen Daa, Norwegian historian, ethnologist, auditor, editor of magazines and newspapers, educator and politician
Yinduu Daa, also known as Daai Chin, ethnic tribe of Myanmar
Claus Daa, a Danish nobleman and landowner

Technology
Data access arrangement, in telecommunications
Designated Approving Authority, in the US Department of Defense, an individual who provides oversight of an IT environment
Detect and Avoid, a set of technologies designed to avoid interference of UWB upon other networks
Direct Access Archive, a file format for disk images

Authentication
Data Authentication Algorithm, a former American standard for authentication codes
Digest access authentication, protocol for negotiating browser user credentials
Direct anonymous attestation, remote authentication of a trusted computer

Other
 Daa, a ward in the Arusha Region of Tanzania
Danmarks Adels Aarbog, (Yearbook of the Danish Nobility), a genealogical publication
Davison Army Airfield, Virginia, United States, a military airport
Decare, a metric area unit equivalent to 1000 square metres
Delaware Aerospace Academy, a camp program run by the Delaware AeroSpace Education Foundation
Designers Against Aids, a non-profit organization which battles against AIDS, together with artists, designers and companies
Diacetone alcohol, a chemical used as an intermediate and solvent
Dictionary of Australian Artists
Dubai American Academy, an educational institute located in Dubai, United Arab Emirates
DAA (Irish company), an Irish company that operates Dublin Airport and Cork Airport